Paracetonurus flagellicauda is a species of fish in the subfamily Macrourinae (grenadiers or rattails). Some sources place it in the genus Pseudonezumia.

Description

Paracetonurus flagellicauda has a slender body, tapering to a string-like tail (hence its specific name flagellicauda, "whip-tail"). It is white with black markings. Its length is maximum .

Habitat

Paracetonurus flagellicauda lives in the northeast Atlantic Ocean and southwest Indian Ocean, and is common in the Azores. The species may migrate along the mid-ocean ridges to travel between oceans.

References

Macrouridae
Fish described in 1927
Taxa named by Einar Laurentius Koefoed